Valentin Eck (Ecchius) (c. 1494 in Lindau (Bodensee) – before 28 September 1556 in Bardejov) was a Swiss traveling humanists, neo-Latin poet, and scholar. He had ties to the Cracow Academy and the early humanist circle in Cracow.

Biography 
Eck came from Lindau (Bodensee). He studied first at Leipzig, and in 1511-1517 at Cracow. He received a bachelor's degree from the Cracow Academy in 1513.

In 1517, Eck moved to Hungary, taking the position of the rector of the school in Bardejov. He maintained his contacts in Poland, however. In 1520-1521, he lectured in Cracow, and perhaps also in 1537-1539. He printed most of his works in the Polish royal city. He counted Rudolf Agricola Junior, Johannes Dantiscus, Joannis Vislicensis, Justus Ludwik Decjusz, and Leonard Cox among his friends.

Eck's most important work, De versificandi arte opusculum, was a manual for writing poetry; it was first published in 1515 and later reissued in 1521 and 1539. Eck was also the author of numerous poems and prose works, many of a laudatory nature, such as the panegyric celebrating Sigismund the Old's victory at the Battle of Orsha in 1514.

With Rudolf Agricola Junior, he edited and published texts by classical authors.

Works 
 Elegiacum Carmen in laudem Philippi Bervaldi, ad Rudolphum suum Agricolam... Cracoviae, 1512. 
 Hymnus exhortatorius ad Cracoviam... 1514. 
 Lucii Flori Bellorum Romanorum Libr. IV... 1515.
 De arte versificandi opusculum... 1515, 1521, 1539.
 Utrum prudenti Viro sit ducenda Vxor. 1518.  
 Ad Clarissimos Viros, Dominum Petrum Czipser, et Andream Reuber, Bartphani populi... 1518. 
 De Mundi contemptu et Virtute amplectenda Dialogus... 1519, 1528. 
 Apophoreticum Carmen de Christi Natiuitate, Elegis compositum... 1520.
 De Reipublicae administratione Dialogus... 1520. 
 Q. Horatii Flacci Liber de Arte Poetica ad Pisones... 1521. 
 Q. Horatii Flacci Epistolarum Libri II... 1522.
 De Ratione legendi Auctores Libellus. 1525, 1534. 
 Aurelii Prudentii Clementis Viri Consularis Liber Peristephanon, hymnos in laudem Sanctorum, qui Martyrio coronati sunt, complexus... 1526.
 Diui Aurelii Augustini, Hipponensis Episcopi, de Vita Christiana ad sororem suam viduam Liber I..., 1529.
 Epigrammatum Sacrorum Liber..., 1537. 
 Epigrammata Pannoniae Luctui, quo Principum aliquot et insignium Virorum mortesaliique funesti Casus deplorantur... 1544.
 Elegiacon ad doctissimum Virum D. Joannem Benedictum, Cracou... Canonicum... 1545.

References

Notes

Bibliography 

 Mała encyklopedia kultury antycznej. Warszawa, 1990.
 Literatura polska. Przewodnik encyklopedyczny. Warszawa, 1989.
 Glomski, Jacqueline. "Careerism at Cracow: The Dedicatory Letters of Rudolf Agricola Junior, Valentin Eck, and Leonard Cox (1510-1530)." In Self-Presentation and Social Identification: The Rhetoric and Pragmatics of Letter Writing in Early Modern Times, edited by T. Van Houdt, J. Papy, G. Tournoy, and C. Matheeussen, 165–82. Leuven: Leuven University Press and Peeters, 2002.
 Glomski, Jacqueline. Patronage and Humanist Literature in the Age of the Jagiellons: Court and Career in the Writings of Rudolf Agricola Junior, Valentin Eck, and Leonard Cox. Toronto: University of Toronto Press, 2007.

New Latin-language poets
16th-century Latin-language writers
Swiss male poets
15th-century births
16th-century deaths